Max Rauffer (born 8 May 1972 in Kolbermoor) is a German former alpine skier who competed in the 2002 Winter Olympics.

External links
 sports-reference.com
 

1972 births
Living people
German male alpine skiers
Olympic alpine skiers of Germany
Alpine skiers at the 2002 Winter Olympics
Sportspeople from Upper Bavaria
20th-century German people
People from Kolbermoor